Lac Kaiagamac Water Aerodrome  was located on Lac Kaiagamac, Quebec, Canada and was open from the middle of May until the middle of November.

References

External links
Airport operator Cargair Ltd. (English site)

Defunct seaplane bases in Quebec